This is a list of medallists from the ICF Canoe Sprint World Championships in men's Canadian.

C-1 200 m
Debuted: 1994.

Dmitriy Sabin of the Ukraine won silver in this event at the 2002 championships, but was disqualified for doping.

C-1 500 m
Debuted: 1971.

C-1 1000 m
Debuted: 1938. Not held: 1948. Resumed: 1950.

C-1 5000 m
Debuted: 2010

C-1 10000 m
Debuted: 1950. Discontinued: 1993.

C-2 200 m
Debuted: 1994.

C-2 500 m
Debuted: 1971.

Sergey Ulegin and Aleksandr Kostoglod of Russia finished second in the 2003 event, but were stripped of the silver medals when Ulegin tested positive for doping.

C-2 1000 m
Debuted: 1938. Not held: 1948. Resumed: 1950.

C-2 10000 m
Debuted: 1938. Not held: 1948. Resumed: 1950. Discontinued: 1993.

C-4 200 m
Debuted: 1994. Discontinued 2009.

Sergey Ulegin, Aleksandr Kostoglod, Roman Kruglyakov, Maksim Opalev of Russia were stripped of their 2003 gold medal when Ulegin tested positive for doping.

C-4 500 m
Debuted: 1989. Discontinued: 2007. Resumed: 2018.

Sergey Ulegin, Aleksandr Kostoglod, Roman Kruglyakov, and Maksim Opalev of Russia finished first in the 2003 championships, but were stripped of their gold medal when Ulegin tested positive for doping.

C-4 1000 m
Debuted: 1989.

Relay C-1 4 × 200 m
Debuted: 2009. Discontinued in 2014.

Mix C-2 200 m
Debuted: 2021

References
 
 
 

ICF Canoe Sprint World Championships men's Canadian